'Sunderland Association Football Club Women' is an English women's football club that plays in the . They play their home games at the Eppleton Colliery Welfare Ground in Hetton-le-Hole, in the City of Sunderland, Tyne and Wear.

Sunderland won the FA Women's Premier League Northern Division in 2004–05 to reach the top tier National Division. After relegation in 2007, they returned to the National Division in 2009 and also lost that season's FA Women's Cup final, 2–1 to holders Arsenal at Pride Park Stadium.

The club's bid to join the FA WSL for the initial 2011 season was controversially rejected in favour of the relatively newly formed, but big spending, Manchester City. This decision led to the departure of many star players (3 of whom represented England in the 2015 World Cup) and is thought to have damaged the development of the women's game in the North East for years to come.  Despite this they responded by winning the Premier League National Division, which had become the second tier, on three consecutive occasions and also collected the 2011–12 FA Women's Premier League Cup. In 2014 Sunderland were accepted into the second division of a newly expanded FA WSL. They won the league on the final day of the season and were promoted into FA WSL 1 for 2015.

At the end of the 2017–18 season, Sunderland A.F.C. Ladies were unsuccessful with their application for a license in both FA Women's Super League and FA Women's Championship, meaning the Lady Black Cats, were demoted to the FA Women's National League North, for the 2018–19 season.

History
The club began in 1989 as a five-a-side team called The Kestrels and won the Women's Football Association (WFA) Yorkshire and Humberside League in 1990. Over the next decade they competed in the Northern Premier as Cowgate Kestrels, RTM Newcastle Kestrels and Blyth Spartans Kestrels. In 2000 the club merged with an independent Sunderland Ladies club, to become Sunderland Women's FC, after winning promotion to the top tier FA Women's Premier League National Division for the first time. The new club was originally financed as part of the established professional Sunderland A.F.C. men's club, but following financial troubles in 2004, the women's side was forced to become financially independent. Sunderland A.F.C. only provided some kit and the home ground.

In 2001–02 Sunderland won one league game all season and were relegated back to the Northern Division. On Sunday 10 April 2005 they won promotion from the Northern Division as champions. In the 2005–06 season, they finished 9th in the league (then the penultimate position), but stayed up after tying a promotion/relegation playoff against Southern runners-up Bristol City W.F.C. 5–5 on aggregate.

With the emergence of Jill Scott and Steph Houghton, the club began to develop a reputation for producing England women's national football team players. On 6 May 2007, with all their games finished and only having 11 points, Sunderland were relegated after Cardiff City beat Doncaster Belles 3–2.

In Season 2007–08 Sunderland finished in 3rd position in The Women's Premier League, Northern Division, behind Champions Nottingham Forest and Lincoln City. The top 3 were almost in a league of their own as Sunderland finished 17 points ahead of 4th placed Newcastle – who only finished 15 points ahead of bottom-of-the-table Crewe Alexandra.

With team re-building completed, the 2008–09 season began with high hopes for the Wearsiders who had six England youth internationals in their ranks and had recently recruited full England international midfielder Kelly McDougall from Everton Ladies.

On 22 March 2009, Sunderland WFC reached the final of the FA Women's Cup after beating Chelsea 3–0. Goals from Williams (2) and Gutteridge ensured their place in the final against holders Arsenal at Pride Park Stadium, home of Derby County on 4 May. In the final, favourites Arsenal beat Sunderland 2–1. Despite dominating possession and creating several chances, Arsenal found it difficult to convert their opportunities. Arsenal's Katie Chapman scored in the first half, their second coming in extended 2nd half injury-time from Kim Little. However, Sunderland never gave up and scored a consolation goal from Kelly McDougall just before the final whistle. Lucy Bronze gave a superb display at right-back, earning herself the Player of the Match Award for the Black Cats.

Sunderland won promotion to the National Premier Division after defeating Preston 4–0 away in the last match of the 2008–09 season.

Back in the top flight, Sunderland exceeded expectations and topped the league for five months. They also handed Arsenal Ladies only their second league defeat in six years. However, the club's bid to join the FA WSL was rejected on commercial and marketing grounds – leading to the departure of star players Lucy Bronze, Jordan Nobbs, Lucy Staniforth and Helen Alderson.

Despite the exodus of these players, Sunderland secured the FA Women's National Premier League title with two games to spare, following their victory over Millwall Lionesses on 3 April 2011. They defended the title two further times in 2012 and 2013. In 2013 they were formally integrated into the Sunderland AFC structure.

In the 2014 season Sunderland entered the newly created FA WSL 2. On 26 October 2014, they were crowned inaugural champions of the FA WSL 2, beating Millwall Lionesses 4-0 on the final day of the season to finish two points ahead of Doncaster Belles. As a result, Sunderland returned to the top division, taking their place in the 2015 FA WSL 1. Manager Mick Mulhern, who won more silverware for the Sunderland Ladies than all other combined northern football teams (Men and Women), stepped down after 15 years for work-related commitments. He was replaced by former professional Carlton Fairweather.

Before the 2017 Spring Series the club announced they switch to part-time players only after three years of having a mix of half- and full-time players.

Prior to the Spring Series, Carlton Fairweather was replaced by his assistant Melanie Copeland, together with her and her new assistant and former player, Victoria Greenwell, they guided the Lady Black Cats to a creditable 5th place finish. Results in the Spring Series included victories against Yeovil Town and Bristol City WFC and draws against Arsenal W.F.C. and Reading F.C. Women.

After the Spring Series, Sunderland A.F.C. Ladies moved from their home venue af the Eppleton Colliery Welfare Ground to Mariners Park home of South Shields FC. However, after a season at Mariners Park, the Lady Black Cats decided to return to their Hetton-le-Hole home, for their debut season in the FA Women's National League North.

Recent seasons

Key

Key to league record:
P = Played
W = Games won
D = Games drawn
L = Games lost
F = Goals for
A = Goals against
Pts = Points
Pos = Final position

Key to divisions:
WSL1 = FA Women's Super League 1
WSL2 = FA Women's Super League 2
WPLN = FA Women's Premier League National Division
WPLR = FA Women's Premier League Northern Division

Key to rounds:
QR = Qualifying round
Grp = Group stage
R1 = Round 1
R2 = Round 2
R3 = Round 3
R4 = Round 4
R5 = Round 5

Key to rounds:
QF = Quarter-finals
SF = Semi-finals
RU = Runners-up
W = Winners
n/a = Not applicable
DNE = Did not enter
Disq = Disqualified

Divisions in bold indicate a change in division tier.

Demoted to FA Women's National League (Tier 3) after not being awarded Tier 1 or 2 licence
Final cancelled due to the Covid-19 pandemic
Promoted to FA Women's Championship (Tier 2) after successfully applying via The Football Association's Upward Club Movement process within the Women’s Football Pyramid

Current squad

Staff 

Head coach:
  Melanie Copeland

Assistant coach:
  Steph Libbey

General Manager:
  Alex Clark

Goalkeeper coach:
  Chris Wilson

Strength and Conditioning coach:
  Lee Fairley

Physiotherapist:
  Cameron Lane

Former players
For details of current and former players, see :Category:Sunderland A.F.C. Ladies players.

Honours

FA Women's Premier League National Division (3): 2010–11, 2011–12, 2012–13
FA WSL 2 (1): 2014
FA Women's Premier League Northern Division (3): 1999–2000 (as Blyth Spartans Kestrels), 2004–05, 2008–09
FA Women's Premier League Cup (1): 2012
FA Women's Cup runner-up (1): 2009

Footnotes
A.  The FA Women's Super League was formed in 2010 for the start of the 2011 season, Sunderland Ladies were not chosen to participate in the newly formed top tier of women's football. Although Sunderland Ladies were not relegated from the top tier of Women's football in England in 2010, they found themselves playing in the second tier at the start of their 2011 campaign.
B.  The FA Women's Super League was expanded to two divisions in 2014 for the start of that years season with the formation of the FA Women's Super League 2. Sunderland Ladies were one of 10 teams elected to participate in the newly formed second tier of women's football for the start of the 2014 season.

References

External links

Official website

1989 establishments in England
Association football clubs established in 1989
Women's football clubs in England
Women
Football clubs in Tyne and Wear
FA WSL 1 teams
Women's Championship (England) teams
FA Women's National League teams